The Slap may refer to:

 The Slap (film), 1974 French/Italian comedy film
 The Slap (novel), 2008 novel by Christos Tsiolkas
 The Slap (Australian TV series), 2011 Australian TV series based on Tsiolkas' novel
 The Slap (American TV series), 2015 U.S. miniseries based on Tsiolkas' novel

See also
 Slap (disambiguation)
 Will Smith–Chris Rock slapping incident